Jean Picard was a French bookbinder, active around 1540. Picard is notable for having bound many books for the bibliophile Jean Grolier. He may also have worked at the French royal bindery.

While the Grolier bindings have long been sought after, the identities of the binders who made them were forgotten until twentieth-century scholarship threw light on Picard and other binders.
The British Library's bindings catalogue attributes a number of bindings to Picard: they are almost all on books bound for Grolier around 1540 in Paris.  The Bibliothèque nationale de France has a larger collection.

Picard and the Aldine Press
Some of Picard's bindings are on books in the celebrated editions of the classics by the Aldine Press of Venice. The press had been founded in 1494, and after the death of its founder, Aldus Manutius, in 1515, his family continued to run the business. As well as binding some of the books, Picard appears to have had a more direct connection with this press, as a man called Jean Picard managed its Parisian agency in the 1540s, selling books on commission. Not all sources agree that the bookseller can be assumed to be the same person as the bookbinder, although the possibility that he was the same person is obvious.

The bookseller Picard's premises were identified by the sign of the dolphin and anchor, the emblem of the Aldine Press. They were in the Rue Saint-Jacques, a street in the Latin Quarter, which was a centre of the book trade. In 1547 he encountered financial problems and fled his creditors. The Aldine Press then appointed a printer called Le Riche as its new agent. Le Riche was replaced after a couple of years by the bookbinder Gomar Estienne, who had been working at the royal bindery, the so-called Atelier de Fontainebleau.  Estienne appears to have acquired some of the bookbinding tools used by Picard.

Picard designs
Picard is associated with a decorative style for which the French term is entrelacs géométriques. This style, which was favoured by Grolier, has interlaced designs which can be described as strapwork or interlaced ribbons. He also worked in other styles.

References

External links
 British Library - Search on "Jean Picard" for images and catalogue entries on over 15 bindings by Picard.

Bookbinders
French booksellers
16th-century French people
Year of birth missing
Year of death missing